Pilot Mound Township is a township in Griggs County, North Dakota, United States.

History
The petition to organize was presented to the Griggs County Commission on February 25, 1887 and the first Township meeting was held on March 15, 1887 at the schoolhouse in Section 25.

Demographics
Its population during the 2010 census was 41.

Location within Griggs County
Pilot Mound Township is located in Township 148 Range 59 west of the Fifth principal meridian.

References

Townships in Griggs County, North Dakota